The Vanderbilt Commodores baseball team is an American National Collegiate Athletic Association (NCAA) college baseball team. From Vanderbilt University in Nashville, Tennessee, the team participates in the Eastern division of the Southeastern Conference (SEC) and plays its home games on campus at Hawkins Field.  The Commodores are coached by three-time National Coach of the Year and three-time SEC Coach of the Year, Tim Corbin. During Corbin's tenure as head coach, Vanderbilt has become one of the premier college baseball programs in the United States, responsible for 19 first-round picks in the MLB draft.

History
Vanderbilt first fielded a baseball team in 1886. Herbert Charles Sanborn, the chair of the Department of Philosophy and Psychology from 1921 to 1942, who was also the president of the Nashville German-American Society, coached the team in 1912–1913. Baseball became a scholarship sport in 1968.

The Commodores secured only three NCAA appearances in the 20th century—in 1973, 1974, and 1980. They had only three other winning seasons in SEC play in the first 35 years of the scholarship era. However, they have been to every NCAA Tournament but one since 2004.  The team qualified for the NCAA Super Regionals in 2004, had the nation's top recruiting class in 2005 according to Baseball America, made the NCAA field again in 2006, and won the 2007 SEC regular-season and SEC tournament crowns. The Commodores were ranked first in most polls for a majority of the 2007 season and earned the #1 national seed for the 2007 NCAA tournament. Vanderbilt's victory over the University of Virginia in the finals of the 2014 NCAA tournament marks the program's first national title and second appearance in the College World Series, having first appeared in 2011. In 2019, Vanderbilt's fourth College World Series appearance, they beat Michigan two games to one in the finals, winning their second national title.

Stadium

The original venue for the Commodores ball club was Dudley Field. Currently, the Commodores play their home games at Hawkins Field, which is an on-campus facility with a 3,700 seat capacity. Temporary outfield bleachers were installed for the 2007 Regionals and all of the 2008 season, bringing the capacity to 3,535. In May 2008, Vanderbilt announced extensive plans to upgrade its athletic facilities, including the addition of permanent seats down the first base line and outfield seats in both left-center and right field. These additions increased the size of Hawkins Field to its current capacity of 3,700 seats. It is adjacent to both Vanderbilt Stadium and Memorial Gymnasium  and is across the street from the McGugin Center. Hawkins Field opened in 2002 and is named after a donor who gave $2 million to help finance construction. The stadium was also the site of the first NCAA Baseball Tournament Regional that Vanderbilt ever hosted when it was the site of the Nashville Regional in 2007. Vanderbilt and Hawkins Field again hosted Regionals in 2011, 2013, 2014, 2015, 2016, 2018, 2019 and 2021, and hosted Super Regionals in 2011, 2013, 2014, 2015, 2018, 2019 and 2021.

Head coaches 
Records are through the end of the 2011 Season

Year-by-year results 

Records taken from the 2011 Vanderbilt baseball media guide.In 1997, Vanderbilt forfeited 30 games due to an ineligible player.

√ Vanderbilt forfeited 30 games due to Hunter Bledsoe being ineligible player.

NCAA tournaments

The NCAA Division I baseball tournament started in 1947.
The format of the tournament has changed through the years.
Vanderbilt's NCAA Tournament History

NCAA records

 Most stolen bases in one inning (6) SEC Opponent Florida Gators May 26, 2012
 Most stolen bases in one inning NCAA Opponent Florida Gators May 26, 2012
 Most stolen bases in a game (7) Opponent Florida Gators May 26, 2012

Conference championships 
Vanderbilt has won 10 conference season championships, 3 conference tournament championships, and 9 conference division championships.

Individual school records

Batting

Batting Average
Season: .459 – Derrick Jones
Career: .425 – Hunter Bledsoe
Hits
Game: 6 (Ralph Greenbaum)
Season: 111 (Warner Jones)
Career: 300 (Dominic De La Osa)
Runs Scored
Game: 5 (10 players)
Season: (Pedro Álvarez)
Career: 208 (Nick Morrow)
Doubles
Game: 4 (Matt Kata)
Season: 27 (Warner Jones)
Career: 63 (Dominic De La Osa)
Triples
Game: 2 (8 players)
Season: 8 (Ryan Klosterman)
Career: 21 (Tony Kemp)
Home Runs
Game: 3 (3 players)
Season: 25 (J. J. Bleday)
Career: 49 (Pedro Álvarez, Scotti Madison)
Total Bases
Game: 13 (John McLean, Greg Thomas)
Season: 186 (Pedro Álvarez)
Career: 452 (Nick Morrow)
Runs Batted In
Game: 9 (David Joiner)
Season: 74 (Warner Jones, Clint Johnston)
Career: 181 (Nick Morrow)
Base on Balls
Game: 5 (3 players)
Season: 63 (Vee Hightower)
Career: 146 (Steve Chandler)
Stolen Bases
Game: 5 (3 players)
Season: 51 (Bob Schabes)
Career: 96 (Charles DeFrance)
Strikeouts
Game: 5 (George Flower)
Season: 73 (Gary Burns)
Career: 182 (Cam Hazen)
Hitting Streak
38 Games (Ryan Flaherty)

Pitching

Wins
Season: 14 (Tyler Beede)
Season: 14 (Carson Fulmer)
Career: 32 (Patrick Raby)
Winning Percentage
Season: 1.000 (Steve Burger, 6–0)
Career: .792  (Jack Nuismer)
Saves
Season: 17 (Tyler Brown)
Career: 26 (Brian Miller)
Games Pitched
Season: 36 (Joe Barbao)
Career: 116 (David Daniels)
Innings Pitched
Game: 13 (Scott Newell)
Season: 133.1 (David Price)
Career: 340.0 (Jim Heins)
Earned Run Average
Season: 1.07 (Jimmy Stephens)
Career: 1.68 (Jeff Peeples)
Strikeouts
Game: 23 (Doug Wessel)
Season: 194 (David Price)
Career: 441 (David Price)

Player awards

Pedro Alvarez
2007 Golden Spikes Award Finalist
2007 Baseball America First Team All American
2007 National Collegiate Baseball Writers Association First Team All American
2007 American Baseball Coaches Association Second Team All American
2006 Baseball America National Freshman of the Year
2006 Collegiate Baseball National Freshman of the Year
2006 Baseball America First Team All American

David Price
2007 Roger Clemens Award Winner
2007 Golden Spikes Award Winner
2007 Dick Howser Trophy Winner
2007 Baseball America College Player of the Year
2007 American Baseball Coaches Association National Player of the Year
2007 American Baseball Coaches Association First Team All American
2007 Brooks Wallace Award Winner
2007 Baseball America College All-America First Team
2007 Collegiate Baseball National Player of the Year
2007 National Collegiate Baseball Writers Association First Team All-American
2007 National Collegiate Baseball Writers Association District Player of the Year
2007 SEC Male Athlete of the Year
2007 SEC Pitcher of the Year
2007 First Team All-SEC
2006 Golden Spikes Award Finalist
2006 Baseball America Summer Player of the Year

Casey Weathers
2007 Baseball America First Team All American
2007 Collegiate Baseball First Team All American
2007 American Baseball Coaches Association First Team All American 
2007 National Collegiate Baseball Writers Association Third Team All American
2007 First Team All SEC

Dansby Swanson
2014 All-Southeastern Conference (SEC) First Team
2014 College World Series Most Outstanding Player
2015 All-SEC Second Team
2015 Baseball America First Team All-American
2015 Collegiate Baseball First Team All-American
2015 Coaches' Poll First Team All-American
First Overall Pick of the 2015 MLB Draft by the Arizona Diamondbacks

SEC awards
Pitcher of the Year
David Price - 2007
Grayson Garvin - 2011
Carson Fulmer - 2015
Player of the Year Award
Hunter Bledsoe - 1999
Tony Kemp - 2013
JJ Bleday - 2019
Freshman of the Year Award
Pedro Alvarez - 2006
Tony Kemp - 2011
Enrique Bradfield Jr. - 2021

First Team All-Americans

Notable players

Pedro Álvarez, infielder, former 1st round draft pick (2nd overall, 2008, Pirates)
Mike Baxter, outfielder, former Padre, Met, Dodger, and Cub
Tyler Beede, pitcher, twice was a 1st round draft pick (2014, Giants), pitches for the Giants
J. J. Bleday, outfielder, 4th overall draft pick (2019, Marlins)
Ben Bowden, pitcher, former 2nd round draft pick (2016, Rockies)
Walker Buehler, All Star pitcher Los Angeles Dodgers, former 1st round draft pick (24th overall, 2015, Dodgers)
Matt Buschmann, pitcher, Arizona Diamondbacks 
Curt Casali, catcher, Seattle Mariners
Nick Christiani, pitcher, former Cincinnati Red
Vince Conde, infielder, former 9th round draft pick (2014, Yankees)
Joey Cora, infielder, former Seattle Mariners All Star 2B
Caleb Cotham, pitcher, Cincinnati Reds
Jason Delay, catcher, Pittsburgh Pirates
Ryan Flaherty, infielder, Atlanta Braves
Jake Eder, pitcher, former fourth round pick (104th overall, 2020, Miami Marlins)
Drake Fellows, pitcher, 6th round pick (2019, Padres)
Carson Fulmer, pitcher, former 1st round draft pick (8th overall, 2015, White Sox)
Grayson Garvin, pitcher, former 1st round draft pick (59th overall, 2011, Rays)
Sonny Gray, pitcher, Minnesota Twins, former 1st round draft pick (18th overall, 2011, Athletics)
Drew Hayes, pitcher, former Cincinnati Red
Taylor Hill, pitcher, former Washington National
Matt Kata, infielder, former Arizona Diamondback
Tony Kemp, infielder, Oakland Athletics
Jeren Kendall, outfielder, Second Team All-SEC (2016)
Jensen Lewis, pitcher, former Cleveland Indian
Austin Martin, infielder, Minnesota Twins, 1st round pick (5th overall, Toronto Blue Jays, 2020)
Mike Minor, pitcher, former 1st round draft pick (7th overall, 2009, Braves)
Josh Paul, catcher, former White Sox, Cub, Angel, Ray
David Price, pitcher, Los Angeles Dodgers, former 1st round draft pick (1st overall, 2007, Rays)
Mark Prior, pitcher, Second Team Freshman All-American (1999)
Bryan Reynolds, outfielder Pittsburgh Pirates, former 2nd round draft pick (2016, Giants)
Antoan Richardson, former Atlanta Brave, New York Yankee
Kumar Rocker, pitcher, 1st round draft pick (10th overall, 2021, New York Mets, 3rd overall, 2022, Texas Rangers)
Ryan Rote, pitcher, former 5th round draft pick (2005, White Sox)
Scott Sanderson, pitcher
Reid Schaller, pitcher, former 3rd round draft pick (2018, Nationals)
Jordan Sheffield, pitcher, former 1st round draft pick (36th overall, 2016, Dodgers)
Jeremy Sowers, pitcher, former 1st round draft pick (6th overall, 2004, Indians)
Dansby Swanson, infielder, Atlanta Braves former 1st round pick (1st overall, 2015, D-Backs)
Will Toffey, infielder, Philadelphia Phillies
Drew VerHagen, pitcher, Detroit Tigers
Casey Weathers, pitcher, former 1st round pick (8th overall, 2007, Rockies)
Rhett Wiseman, outfielder, former 3rd round draft pick (2015, Nationals)
Kyle Wright, pitcher, former 1st round pick (5th overall, 2017, Braves)
Mike Yastrzemski, outfielder San Francisco Giants, former 14th round draft pick (2013, Orioles)
Josh Zeid, pitcher, former Houston Astro
Kevin Ziomek, pitcher, former 2nd round draft pick (2013, Tigers)

See also
List of NCAA Division I baseball programs
2008 Vanderbilt Commodores baseball team

References

External links